Beeld (freely translated as Picture or Image) is an Afrikaans-language daily newspaper that was launched on 16 September 1974. Beeld is distributed in four provinces of South Africa: Gauteng, Mpumalanga, Limpopo and North West, previously part of the former Transvaal province. Beeld (English: The Image) was an Afrikaans-language Sunday newspaper in the late 1960s.

Supplements 
Sake (Mon-Fri) 
Motors (Thur)
Vrydag (Fri)

List of editors 
 Schalk Pienaar (1974–1975)
 Johannes Grosskopf (1975–1977)
 Ton Vosloo (1977–1983)
 Willem Wepener (1983–1989)
 Salie de Swardt (1989–1992)
 Willie Kühn (1993–1996)
 Johan de Wet (1996–1999)
 Arrie Rossouw (1999–2000)
 Peet Kruger (2000–2009)
 Tim du Plessis (2009–2011)
 Peet Kruger (2011–2013)
 Adriaan Basson (2013–2015)
 Barnard Beukman (2015–present)

Distribution areas

Distribution figures

Readership figures

See also 
 List of newspapers in South Africa

References

External links
 

 

Afrikaner culture in Johannesburg
Daily newspapers published in South Africa
Afrikaans-language newspapers
Mass media in Johannesburg
1974 establishments in South Africa
Publications established in 1974